John Roderick Dahmer (September 5, 1937 – November 26, 1988) was elected a member of the House of Commons of Canada in 1988. His background was in education.  A school teacher, guidance councillor, principal, and later involved in adult education, correctional education and vocational training as a director at Lakeland College.

He was elected in the 1988 federal election at the Beaver River electoral district for the Progressive Conservative party; however, he was terminally stricken with pancreatic cancer and never saw the first day of the 34th Canadian Parliament.

Dahmer had entered Edmonton's Royal Alexandra Hospital on October 28, 1988, after suffering symptoms similar to adult onset type two diabetes, but the extent of his condition was not widely known until after election night.  However, by the time cancer was discovered it was after the deadline to withdraw from the general election, and at that point it was not certain the cancer could not be successfully treated with chemotherapy.

Dahmer died five days after the election, before the Deputy Clerk of the House of Commons could arrive to conduct a swearing-in ceremony. Despite this, parliamentary policy allowed Dahmer's widow to receive a $29,150 severance, which was equivalent to six months salary in office.  This money was used to establish the John Dahmer Community Involvement Scholarship at Lakeland College.

He holds the record for the shortest term as a federal Member of Parliament in Canadian history.

By-election
Dahmer's widow, Donna Lynne (née Coulter), ran unsuccessfully for the Progressive Conservative nomination in the resulting by-election, losing to Dave Broda.

Broda lost the by-election to Deborah Grey, the first Reform Party candidate ever elected to the House of Commons. Grey had also been the Reform candidate in the 1988 election, but finished in fourth place.

Electoral record

References

External links
 

1937 births
1988 deaths
People from Red Deer, Alberta
Deaths from pancreatic cancer
Members of the House of Commons of Canada from Alberta
Progressive Conservative Party of Canada MPs